Uyunqimg or Oyunchimeg (born December 1942) is a retired Chinese politician of Mongol ethnicity. Between 2008 and 2013, she served as a Vice-Chair of the Standing Committee of the National People's Congress, the national legislature. Between 2000 and 2003 Uyunqimg served as Chairwoman of Inner Mongolia. She is the highest ranked woman of ethnic minority background to have served in the Chinese government in the history of the People's Republic.

Biography 
Originally from Beipiao County, Liaoning, she entered the workforce in August 1964, and became a member of the Chinese Communist Party in July 1966. She graduated from Inner Mongolia University of Science and Technology in 1960 and Inner Mongolia Communist Party School in 1964.

Uyunqimg rose to prominence in Inner Mongolia Autonomous Region. In August 2000 she became the Vice party chief of the Inner Mongolian CPC Committee, and the Vice Chairman and Acting Chairman of the Inner Mongolia Autonomous Region, the first woman to take the position, and the second woman in the history of the People's Republic to become a provincial-level head of government (after Gu Xiulian). From 2001 to April 2003, she served as the Chairman of the Inner Mongolia Autonomous Region. At the 2003 National People's Congress session held in March, she became a Vice-Chair of its Standing Committee, the body which acts as a day-to-day legislative body when the NPC is not in session.

References 

1942 births
Politicians from Chaoyang, Liaoning
Chinese Communist Party politicians from Liaoning
Living people
People's Republic of China politicians from Liaoning
Political office-holders in Inner Mongolia
Vice Chairpersons of the National People's Congress
Chinese people of Mongolian descent
20th-century Chinese women politicians
21st-century Chinese women politicians
21st-century Chinese politicians